Events in the year 1941 in Brazil.

Incumbents

Federal government
President: Getúlio Vargas

Governors 
 Alagoas: José Maria Correia das Neves (till 19 February); Ismar de Góis Monteiro (from 19 February)
 Amazonas: Álvaro Botelho Maia
 Bahia: Landulfo Alves 
 Ceará: Francisco de Meneses Pimentel
 Espírito Santo: João Punaro Bley
 Goiás: Pedro Ludovico Teixeira
 Maranhão:
 Mato Grosso: Júlio Strübing Müller
 Minas Gerais: Benedito Valadares Ribeiro
 Pará: José Carneiro da Gama Malcher
 Paraíba: Rui Carneiro
 Paraná: Manuel Ribas
 Pernambuco: Agamenon Magalhães
 Piauí: Leônidas Melo 
 Rio Grande do Norte: Rafael Fernandes Gurjão 
 Rio Grande do Sul: Osvaldo Cordeiro de Farias
 Santa Catarina: Nereu Ramos
 São Paulo: Ademar de Barros (till 4 June); Fernando de Sousa Costa (from 4 June)
 Sergipe: Erônides de Carvalho (till 30 June); Milton Pereira de Azevedo (from 30 June)

Vice governors 
 Rio Grande do Norte: no vice governor
 São Paulo: no vice governor

Events
21 September - The Estádio Presidente Vargas is opened at Fortaleza.
date unknown 
The pulp and paper company Celulose Irani is founded in the State of Rio Grande do Sul.
Oscar Lorenzo Fernández's nationalist-themed opera, Malazarte, to a libretto by José Pereira Graça Aranha, receives its première at the Teatro Municipal, Rio de Janeiro, eight years after it was completed.

Arts and culture

Films
Barulho na Universidade	
24 Horas de Sonho

Births

12 February - Dominguinhos, composer, accordionist and singer (died 2013)
15 February - Florinda Bolkan, actress
26 March - José Edison Mandarino, tennis player
22 April - José Guilherme Merquior,  diplomat, academic, writer, literary critic and philosopher (died 1991)
29 April - Nana Caymmi, singer, daughter of Dorival Caymmi
21 June - Eduardo Suplicy, left-wing politician, economist and professor
7 August - Celso Lafer, jurist, philosopher and politician
30 August - Nelson Xavier, actor (died 2017)

Deaths
9 March - Nestor Gomez, politician (born 1875)

References

See also 
1941 in Brazilian football
List of Brazilian films of 1941

 
1940s in Brazil
Years of the 20th century in Brazil
Brazil
Brazil